Macrophoma is a genus of anamorphic fungi in the family Botryosphaeriaceae.  Some of these species are pathogenic, for example M. musae is a banana fungus.

Species

Macrophoma abietis
Macrophoma abietis-pectinatae
Macrophoma abscondita
Macrophoma acaciaecola
Macrophoma acanthina
Macrophoma aceris
Macrophoma acervata
Macrophoma achyranthis
Macrophoma acinicola
Macrophoma acinorum
Macrophoma aconiti
Macrophoma actinidiae
Macrophoma acuaria
Macrophoma adenii
Macrophoma aegles
Macrophoma aequivoca
Macrophoma agapanthi
Macrophoma agaves
Macrophoma ailanthi
Macrophoma akitensis
Macrophoma alaterni
Macrophoma albifructa
Macrophoma albiziae
Macrophoma alcearum
Macrophoma allahabadensis
Macrophoma allantospora
Macrophoma allospora
Macrophoma alni
Macrophoma alnigena
Macrophoma aloës
Macrophoma aloëtica
Macrophoma amaryllidicola
Macrophoma americana
Macrophoma ampelopsidis
Macrophoma amsoniae
Macrophoma annonae
Macrophoma antarctica
Macrophoma anthurii
Macrophoma antirrhini
Macrophoma aphyllantis
Macrophoma aquilegiae
Macrophoma araliae
Macrophoma arengae
Macrophoma arens
Macrophoma ariae
Macrophoma aromatica
Macrophoma artabotrydicola
Macrophoma artemisiae
Macrophoma arundinae
Macrophoma asphodeli
Macrophoma aspidistrae
Macrophoma astericola
Macrophoma atraphaxis
Macrophoma aucubae
Macrophoma aucubana
Macrophoma aucubicola
Macrophoma aurantii
Macrophoma azorici
Macrophoma baccariniana
Macrophoma bacillaris
Macrophoma baculum
Macrophoma bakeri
Macrophoma barringtoniae
Macrophoma bengalensis
Macrophoma bignoniae
Macrophoma boerhaviae
Macrophoma bohemica
Macrophoma bolbophila
Macrophoma boltoniae
Macrophoma borziana
Macrophoma boussingaultiae
Macrophoma brasiliensis
Macrophoma brevipes
Macrophoma brezhnevii
Macrophoma brunnea
Macrophoma brunneo-fincta
Macrophoma burserae
Macrophoma byrsonimae
Macrophoma caballeroi
Macrophoma cajanicola
Macrophoma cakiles
Macrophoma calophylli
Macrophoma calotropidis
Macrophoma camarana
Macrophoma camelliae
Macrophoma canephorae
Macrophoma cannae-indicae
Macrophoma capsellae
Macrophoma caricina
Macrophoma carpinicola
Macrophoma caryotae
Macrophoma cassavae
Macrophoma cassiocarpa
Macrophoma castaneicola
Macrophoma cattleyicola
Macrophoma cavarae
Macrophoma ceanothi
Macrophoma celastrina
Macrophoma celtidicola
Macrophoma cephalanthae
Macrophoma cerasina
Macrophoma cercidis
Macrophoma cercidospora
Macrophoma cercis
Macrophoma chenopodii
Macrophoma chilicola
Macrophoma chionanthi
Macrophoma choisyae
Macrophoma chollematospora
Macrophoma chrysothamni
Macrophoma cinnamomi-glanduliferi
Macrophoma circinans
Macrophoma citri
Macrophoma citrulli
Macrophoma clavuligera
Macrophoma clematidis
Macrophoma clitoricarpa
Macrophoma cliviae
Macrophoma cneori
Macrophoma cocculi
Macrophoma cocophila
Macrophoma cocos
Macrophoma coffeae
Macrophoma collabens
Macrophoma commelinae
Macrophoma conica
Macrophoma convolvulacearum
Macrophoma convolvuli
Macrophoma cordylines
Macrophoma coronillae
Macrophoma coronillae-emeri
Macrophoma corticicola
Macrophoma corylina
Macrophoma crassipes
Macrophoma crataegi
Macrophoma crescentina
Macrophoma crinicola
Macrophoma crozalsii
Macrophoma cruciferarum
Macrophoma cruenta
Macrophoma crustosa
Macrophoma cucurbitacearum
Macrophoma cupressi
Macrophoma cyamopsidis
Macrophoma cycadis
Macrophoma cylindrica
Macrophoma cynanchina
Macrophoma dalbergiicola
Macrophoma daphniphylli
Macrophoma decorticans
Macrophoma decosteae
Macrophoma dendrocalami
Macrophoma depressula
Macrophoma dianthi
Macrophoma dictamni
Macrophoma diospyri
Macrophoma diospyricola
Macrophoma dodonaeae
Macrophoma dracaenae-fragrantis
Macrophoma draconis
Macrophoma dryadis
Macrophoma dryopteris
Macrophoma duvauicola
Macrophoma dyckiae
Macrophoma edulis
Macrophoma ehretiae
Macrophoma elongata
Macrophoma endophlaea
Macrophoma engleriana
Macrophoma ensetes
Macrophoma enteleae
Macrophoma ephedrae
Macrophoma epidendri
Macrophoma eremosparti
Macrophoma eriobotryae
Macrophoma erumpens
Macrophoma eryngii
Macrophoma eucalyptorum
Macrophoma eugeniae
Macrophoma euonymi
Macrophoma euonymicola
Macrophoma euonymi-japonicae
Macrophoma euphorbiae
Macrophoma euphorbiicola
Macrophoma eusticta
Macrophoma exaci
Macrophoma fabae
Macrophoma fagoniae
Macrophoma fagopyri
Macrophoma fagopyricola
Macrophoma falconeri
Macrophoma farlowiana
Macrophoma fici
Macrophoma fici-caricae
Macrophoma ficina
Macrophoma filamentosa
Macrophoma fimicola
Macrophoma fitzpatriciana
Macrophoma flaccida
Macrophoma fomitalis
Macrophoma forsythiae
Macrophoma fragilis
Macrophoma fraxini
Macrophoma fusigera
Macrophoma fusispora
Macrophoma gallicola
Macrophoma genistae
Macrophoma georgica
Macrophoma geranii
Macrophoma gibelliana
Macrophoma gladioli
Macrophoma glandaria
Macrophoma glaucii
Macrophoma glochidii
Macrophoma gloeosporioides
Macrophoma glycosmidis
Macrophoma gongrogena
Macrophoma gordoniae
Macrophoma gossypii
Macrophoma gouaniae
Macrophoma graminicola
Macrophoma granatensis
Macrophoma grossetexta
Macrophoma grossulariae
Macrophoma guevinae
Macrophoma gymnopogri
Macrophoma haloxyli
Macrophoma halstedii
Macrophoma haraeana
Macrophoma hederacea
Macrophoma hedychii
Macrophoma helicina
Macrophoma hemerocallidis
Macrophoma hennebergii
Macrophoma henriquesiana
Macrophoma heptapleuri
Macrophoma heraclei
Macrophoma heterospora
Macrophoma heuffelii
Macrophoma hibisci
Macrophoma hibiscicola
Macrophoma hippoglossi
Macrophoma hispalensis
Macrophoma hispanica
Macrophoma hochreutineri
Macrophoma holoschoeni
Macrophoma holosteicola
Macrophoma horaninoviae
Macrophoma hypomutilospora
Macrophoma ilicella
Macrophoma ilicis-cornutae
Macrophoma insulana
Macrophoma ipomoeae
Macrophoma ischurochloae
Macrophoma jaczevskii
Macrophoma janiphae
Macrophoma japonica
Macrophoma jasminicola
Macrophoma jodinae
Macrophoma juglandaria
Macrophoma juglandis
Macrophoma juncei
Macrophoma kalanchoës
Macrophoma keckii
Macrophoma labiatarum
Macrophoma laburni
Macrophoma lagenariae
Macrophoma lagerstroemiae
Macrophoma lanceolata
Macrophoma launaeae
Macrophoma lauri
Macrophoma laurina
Macrophoma laurocerasi
Macrophoma leguminum
Macrophoma lentiscina
Macrophoma leopoldivora
Macrophoma lepidii
Macrophoma leptopoda
Macrophoma leucorrhodia
Macrophoma leucothoës
Macrophoma ligustica
Macrophoma lilii
Macrophoma liliicola
Macrophoma linderae
Macrophoma lini
Macrophoma livistonae
Macrophoma longispora
Macrophoma luffae
Macrophoma lupini
Macrophoma luzonensis
Macrophoma maclurae
Macrophoma macrochloae
Macrophoma macrosperma
Macrophoma macrospora
Macrophoma maesae
Macrophoma magnifructua
Macrophoma magnoliae
Macrophoma malcomiae
Macrophoma malenconii
Macrophoma malpighiae
Macrophoma mamillaris
Macrophoma mangiferae
Macrophoma manihotis
Macrophoma mantegazziana
Macrophoma mariesii
Macrophoma maticola
Macrophoma maublancii
Macrophoma medicaginis
Macrophoma megasperma
Macrophoma melanostigma
Macrophoma meloplaca
Macrophoma memorabilis
Macrophoma mexicana
Macrophoma micromegala
Macrophoma miersi
Macrophoma millepunctata
Macrophoma miltoniae
Macrophoma mimuli
Macrophoma minima
Macrophoma minuta
Macrophoma mirabilis
Macrophoma monsterae
Macrophoma morindae
Macrophoma mucipara
Macrophoma multiflorana
Macrophoma musarum
Macrophoma mygindae
Macrophoma nasturtii
Macrophoma negundinis
Macrophoma nelumbii
Macrophoma neottopteridis
Macrophoma nerii
Macrophoma neriicola
Macrophoma nervicola
Macrophoma nevadensis
Macrophoma nicotianae
Macrophoma nitens
Macrophoma nobilis
Macrophoma numerosa
Macrophoma nuptialis
Macrophoma oblongata
Macrophoma obsoleta
Macrophoma oenotherae
Macrophoma oenotherae-biennis
Macrophoma oleandri
Macrophoma oleandrina
Macrophoma oncidii
Macrophoma onobrychidis
Macrophoma ononidicola
Macrophoma opuntiae-phaeacanthae
Macrophoma opuntiae-robustae
Macrophoma opuntiicola
Macrophoma orchidicola
Macrophoma oreophila
Macrophoma oryzae
Macrophoma pachysandrae
Macrophoma paeoniae
Macrophoma pallida
Macrophoma pandani
Macrophoma paniculata
Macrophoma papaveris
Macrophoma papayae
Macrophoma paraphysata
Macrophoma passerinii
Macrophoma passiflorae
Macrophoma passifloricola
Macrophoma paulistana
Macrophoma peckiana
Macrophoma pedrosensis
Macrophoma pegani
Macrophoma pellicida
Macrophoma pellucida
Macrophoma pentapanacis
Macrophoma pentatropidis
Macrophoma pernettyae
Macrophoma perseae
Macrophoma persicina
Macrophoma petiolata
Macrophoma petiolicola
Macrophoma petrakiana
Macrophoma phacidiella
Macrophoma phacidioides
Macrophoma phaseolicola
Macrophoma phaseoli-lunati
Macrophoma philesiae
Macrophoma philodendri
Macrophoma phlei
Macrophoma phomiformis
Macrophoma phormiana
Macrophoma phormii
Macrophoma phorodendri
Macrophoma photiniae
Macrophoma phyllerium
Macrophoma phyllocacti
Macrophoma phyllogenata
Macrophoma physalospora
Macrophoma piceae
Macrophoma pilocarpi
Macrophoma pini-densiflorae
Macrophoma pinsaponis
Macrophoma piperina
Macrophoma piperis
Macrophoma pisoniae
Macrophoma pistaciae
Macrophoma pistaciicola
Macrophoma pittosporina
Macrophoma pituranthi
Macrophoma plumeriae
Macrophoma politii
Macrophoma polygonati
Macrophoma populi
Macrophoma populi-nigrae
Macrophoma porteri
Macrophoma pritchardiae
Macrophoma projecta
Macrophoma prosopidis
Macrophoma pulchrispora
Macrophoma punctiformis
Macrophoma purpurascens
Macrophoma pycnocomonis
Macrophoma pyrenacanthae
Macrophoma pyri
Macrophoma quercicola
Macrophoma ramulicola
Macrophoma ranunculi
Macrophoma raphidophorae
Macrophoma raui
Macrophoma reichenbachiana
Macrophoma restaldii
Macrophoma rhabdosporioides
Macrophoma rhaphidophorae
Macrophoma rhoina
Macrophoma ricini
Macrophoma romanzoffiana
Macrophoma rosae
Macrophoma rotalae
Macrophoma rubi
Macrophoma rumicicola
Macrophoma rumicis
Macrophoma sacchari
Macrophoma saginae
Macrophoma salicaria
Macrophoma salicina
Macrophoma salicis
Macrophoma samaricola
Macrophoma sapindi
Macrophoma saponariae
Macrophoma scandens
Macrophoma scaphidiospora
Macrophoma schefflerae
Macrophoma scheidweileri
Macrophoma scutellata
Macrophoma secalina
Macrophoma seminalis
Macrophoma senecionis
Macrophoma seriata
Macrophoma sheldonii
Macrophoma shoreae
Macrophoma sicula
Macrophoma sinensis
Macrophoma sisymbrii
Macrophoma smilacinae
Macrophoma smilacis
Macrophoma solanicola
Macrophoma sophorae
Macrophoma sophoricola
Macrophoma sorghicola
Macrophoma spegazzinii
Macrophoma sphaeropsispora
Macrophoma sphaerosperma
Macrophoma sporoboli
Macrophoma stachydis
Macrophoma stanhopeicola
Macrophoma stephanotidis
Macrophoma sterculiae
Macrophoma stiparum
Macrophoma strobi
Macrophoma subconica
Macrophoma suberis
Macrophoma subiculis
Macrophoma sugi
Macrophoma superposita
Macrophoma surinamensis
Macrophoma suspecta
Macrophoma sycophila
Macrophoma sydowiana
Macrophoma symbolanthi
Macrophoma tabaci
Macrophoma tagetis
Macrophoma tamaricis
Macrophoma tami
Macrophoma tertia
Macrophoma thalictricola
Macrophoma theicola
Macrophoma thermopsidis
Macrophoma thujana
Macrophoma toddaliae
Macrophoma triacanthi
Macrophoma trichosanthis
Macrophoma trichostomi
Macrophoma tricyrtidis
Macrophoma trigonellae
Macrophoma tristaniae
Macrophoma triticina
Macrophoma tumefaciens
Macrophoma turconii
Macrophoma ulcinjensis
Macrophoma ulmi
Macrophoma ulmicola
Macrophoma urenae
Macrophoma utriculorum
Macrophoma vanillae
Macrophoma varanasiensis
Macrophoma veronensis
Macrophoma versabilis
Macrophoma versatilis
Macrophoma viburni
Macrophoma viciosoi
Macrophoma villaresiae
Macrophoma vincae
Macrophoma vincetoxici
Macrophoma volkameriae
Macrophoma xanthina
Macrophoma yamabeana
Macrophoma yuccae
Macrophoma yuccicarpa
Macrophoma zanthoxyli
Macrophoma zeae
Macrophoma zeraphiana
Macrophoma zeylanicae
Macrophoma ziziphina

External links
Index Fungorum

Botryosphaeriaceae
Dothideomycetes genera